Kollur  is a village in the southern state of Karnataka, India. It is located in the Byndoor taluk of Udupi district in Karnataka.

Demographics
As of 2001 India census,Kollour had a population of 3863 with 1900 males and 1962 females.

Mookambika Devi Temple, Kollur
Mookambika Devi Temple is located in Kollur, which lays approximately 80 km from Udupi and 135 km from Mangalore. The temple is located in the valley of Kodachadri peak. Mookambika Devi Temple is a famous pilgrimage site.
Opening Timing: 5:00 AM – 1:30 PM and 3:00 PM – 9:00 PM

Mookambika Road Byndoor railway station
Mookambika Road Byndoor is a railway station in coastal Karnataka in South India. Its four-letter code is BYNR. Mookambika Road Byndoor is the main railway station in the town of Byndoor in Udupi district. It serves Byndoor city which is 1 kilometre away from the station Trains from here connect the city to prominent state capitals of India like, Bangalore, Thiruvananthapuram (via Southern Railway), Mumbai (via Konkan Railway) and so forth. Rail connectivity in Byndoor was established in 1997. A total of 34 express and passenger trains stop here; there was one originating and terminating trains at this station: Mokambika Road–Kannur Passenger train; however, this service was terminated in 2017 within two years of service due to lack of revenue generation.[2] Although the railway station caters to a lot of passengers and superfast trains on a daily basis, it does not have a siding line or passing loop. Any crossing of trains can only happen either on Bijoor railway station or Shiroor railway stations 19 km apart.

See also
 Udupi
 Byndoor
 Districts of Karnataka
 Murdeshwara

References

External links
 http://Udupi.nic.in/

Villages in Udupi district